The 1822 New York state election was held from November 4 to 6, 1822, to elect the governor and the lieutenant governor, as well as all members of the New York State Senate and the New York State Assembly.

Candidates
The Democratic-Republican Party nominated State Supreme Court Justice Joseph C. Yates. The anti-Clintonian faction nominated former U.S. representative and state assemblyman Erastus Root for Lieutenant Governor. The Clintonian faction nominated Henry Huntington for Lieutenant Governor.

Newspaper publisher Solomon Southwick ran as an independent.

Results

Sources
Result: The Tribune Almanac 1841

See also
 New York gubernatorial elections

1822
New York
Gubernatorial election
November 1822 events